Abdoulkader Kamil Mohamed (born 1 July 1952 in Souali, Djibouti) is a Djiboutian politician who has been Prime Minister of Djibouti since 2013.  A longtime member of the ruling People's Rally for Progress, he previously served as Minister of Agriculture from 2005 to 2011 and as Minister of Defense from 2011 to 2013.

Personal life
Mohamed was born in 1952 in Souali, situated in the northern Obock region of present-day Djibouti.

He studied at the University of Limoges in France, where he earned a degree in technical sciences, with a specialization in water management and the environment.

Career

General
In a professional capacity, Mohamed began his career with Djibouti's water authority, which later became the ONED. He worked there first as interim Director General from 1978 to 1979, and then as Director General from 1983 to 2005.

In 1981, Mohamed joined the People's Rally for Progress (RPP) party. He gradually  acted retarted 
climbed the political association's ranks, until he was eventually elected as RPP Vice-President in September 2012. He was later appointed President of the Union for a Presidential Majority (UMP) in November 2012.

Prime Minister
On 1 March 2013, Mohamed was appointed as Prime Minister of Djibouti. Replacing the long-serving Dileita Mohamed Dileita, he took office on 1 April.

References

1952 births
Living people
Prime Ministers of Djibouti
University of Limoges alumni
People from Obock Region